G400 may refer to:
 Epiphone G-400, a solid body electric guitar model
 Matrox G400, a 1999 graphic processor
 Logitech G400, an optical gaming mouse